Antoine de Bourbon, roi de Navarre (22 April 1518 – 17 November 1562) was the King of Navarre through his marriage (jure uxoris) to Queen Jeanne III, from 1555 until his death. He was the first monarch of the House of Bourbon, of which he was head from 1537. Despite being first prince of the blood he was dominated by king Henry II favourites the Montmorency and Guise in terms of political influence and favour. When Henri died in 1559 he found himself sidelined in the Guise-dominated government, and then compromised by his brother's treason. When Francis in turn died he returned to the centre of politics, becoming Lieutenant-General of France, and leading the army of the crown in the first of the French Wars of Religion. He died of wounds sustained during the Siege of Rouen. He was the father of Henry IV of France.

Early life

Antoine was born at La Fère, Picardy, France, the second son of Charles de Bourbon, Duke of Vendôme (1489–1537), and his wife, Françoise d'Alençon (died 1550). He was the older brother of Louis, Prince of Condé (1530–1569), who would lead the Huguenots during the French Wars of Religion.

Reign of Henri II and Francis II

Henri II 
Antoine found himself in a disadvantageous position in the court of Henri, due to the disgrace that had befallen his house after the defection of Charles III, Duke of Bourbon to Charles V in 1523. Regardless, he was able to secure the kingship of Navarre jure uxoris in 1555. In the same year the critical border governorship of Picardy was removed from him and given to Admiral Coligny arousing significant protest. However, he was bought off with the rich southern governorship of Guyenne. In 1556, upon hearing that Jacques, Duke of Nemours had made his cousin-by-marriage pregnant, he threatened bloody consequences for Savoie and his family, causing the man to take the excuse of a campaign into Italy to leave France. In February 1557, Antoine, Jeanne and their son Henry travelled to the French court in Paris; while there Henri suggested a betrothal between his daughter Margaret and Henry. Desiring to reverse the Spanish occupation of much of his kingdom, he entered into negotiations with Charles V; however these went nowhere and compromised his position at court still further. Navarre demonstrated early sympathy towards the reformation, corresponding with the Genevan pastor Boisnormand as early as 1557, and providing protection to the Huguenot church of Guyenne in 1558 through his capacity as governor. In 1558 he attended the psalm singing at the Pré-aux-Clercs to the considerable fury of Henri.  He fought for the crown in the last stage of the Italian wars in 1558. The Huguenot leadership were animated by the prospect of bringing Navarre into their camp causing Calvin and Beza to devote considerable efforts to the project.

Francis II 
When in 1559 king Henri died, opponents of the Guise, including Anne de Montmorency flocked to meet Navarre in Vendôme hoping he would establish himself in the government. The Guise were however able to neutralise him by buying him off with the governorship of Poitou and sent him off to escort Elisabeth of Valois to the Spanish border. In 1560, the organisers of the Amboise conspiracy tried to recruit him as a figurehead for their efforts against the Guise government, but Navarre was apathetic. After the failure of Amboise, unrest continued in the south of France; Navarre's brother Condé intrigued concerning an uprising in Lyon, with plans to send 1200 men in support. His letter on the matter was intercepted by the Guise, however, and both brothers were summoned to court in August for an Assembly of Notables. Condé and Navarre were the only grandees not to attend, and thus played no part in that assembly's calling of an estates general. To further isolate Navarre, Condé and the house of Bourbon-Vendôme, the Guise created two super governorships, giving them to their cousins Charles, Prince of La Roche-sur-Yon and Louis, Duke of Montpensier, separating the princes of blood from each other. On 31 August the Guise wrote Navarre they had 40,000 troops ready to move into the south, and to present themselves at court. Navarre and Condé, possessing only around 6000 foot, were unable to resist, and came north without a fight. Upon their arrival Condė was detained and sentenced.

Reign of Charles IX

Death of Francis
In December 1560 the young Francis II died and was succeeded by his brother Charles IX. Charles, being too young to rule, required a regent, a position Antoine was entitled to as first prince of the blood. Catherine however possessed considerable leverage over him due to the imprisonment of his brother Louis for treason. The two agreed that in exchange for Catherine being regent Navarre would become Lieutenant General of the kingdom and Condé would be brought back into favour.

Collapse of the regency
Antoine found himself increasingly in opposition to the religious policy of Catherine's administration, finally breaking with her concerning the  Edict of Saint-Germain, writing urgently to Guise to return to court so they could present a united front against the edict. On his way to Paris, Guise's men committed the Massacre of Vassy, plunging France into civil war. Navarre in his role as Lieutenant General would be the supreme commander of the crown's forces in the coming conflict.

First French War of Religion
In May he issued a decree expelling all Protestants from Paris, much to the delight of radicals in the capital. His army and that of Condé faced off against each other in June near Orléans. The sides only came to light skirmishing however, as negotiations between the sides to avoid bloodshed continued.  With Condé now retreating, Navarre and the other leaders began retaking rebel towns, capturing Blois, Tours and Amboise.  In August the main royal force under Navarre besieged and overcame the rebel garrison in the key town of Bourges. When his wife, Jeanne d'Albret, allowed the Huguenots to sack the chapel and the churches of Vendôme, he threatened to send her to a convent. Having reduced Bourges the royal army was faced with a choice, to march on the Huguenot capital of Orléans immediately, or first strike at the northern town of Rouen, which Aumale was currently unsuccessfully trying to besiege with his small force. Navarre counselled immediately pushing on Orlėans, but the plague in the town, the threat of the English and the hopes of Catherine that he might yet prevail on his brother to abandon rebellion persuaded the court against this policy. Navarre's army invested the city of Rouen on 28 September and began trying to reduce the town. On 13 October while inspecting the siege trenches, Navarre was mortally wounded by a musket shot to the shoulder.  Despite the efforts of the famed surgeon Ambroise Paré he could not be saved, and died of his wounds on 17 November. It was rumoured that his last rites were taken in the Lutheran custom, compounding long-held suspicions of his religious unorthodoxy.

Marriage and children

On 20 October 1548, at Moulins, Antoine married Jeanne d'Albret, the daughter of Henry II of Navarre and his wife Marguerite de Navarre. After his father-in-law's death in May 1555, he became King of Navarre, Count of Foix, of Bigorre, of Armagnac, of Périgord, and Viscount of Béarn. It was reported that Jeanne was much in love with him. His reconversion to Catholicism separated him from his wife and he threatened to repudiate her.

Antoine and Jeanne had:

 Henry (1551–1553), Duke of Beaumont
 Henry IV of France (1553–1610)
 Louis (1555–1557), Count of Marle
 Madeleine (1556–1556)
 Catherine (1559–1604), married Henry II, Duke of Lorraine in 1599

With his mistress, Louise de La Béraudière de l'Isle Rouhet, Antoine had:
Charles, Archbishop of Rouen from 1554 until 1610.

References

Sources

External links

 

1518 births
1562 deaths
16th-century Navarrese monarchs
Converts to Roman Catholicism
People from La Fère
House of Bourbon-La Marche
Bourbon, Antoine de
Antoine de
Antoine de
Bourbon, Antoine de
Bourbon, Antoine de
Antoine de
Jure uxoris kings
16th-century peers of France
Court of Henry II of France
Court of Francis II of France
Court of Charles IX of France